Nina Bradley (born 20 October 1987) is a British professional boxer who has held the Commonwealth super-lightweight title since 2018.

Professional career 

Bradley made her professional debut on 20 May 2017 at the Newark Showground in Newark, Nottinghamshire, scoring a four round points decision victory over Monika Antonik.

After winning her first five fights, she faced Feriche Mashauri for the vacant Commonwealth female super-lightweight title on 15 September 2018 at the King Power Stadium in Leicester. Bradley won via unanimous decision with two judges scoring the bout 99–92, and the third scoring it 97–93.

Two fights later she fought Terri Harper on 8 March 2019 for the vacant WBC International female lightweight title at the Barnsley Metrodome, Barnsley. Bradley lost the fight, and her unbeaten record, by technical knockout (TKO) in the tenth and final round. At the time of the stoppage, all three judges had Harper winning on the scorecards (89–80, 89–80, 90–79).

Professional boxing record

References 

Living people
1987 births
Sportspeople from Lincolnshire
English women boxers
Light-welterweight boxers
Commonwealth Boxing Council champions